Patriarch Gerasimus of Constantinople may refer to:

 Gerasimus I of Constantinople, Ecumenical Patriarch in 1320–1321
 Gerasimus II of Constantinople, Ecumenical Patriarch in 1673–1674
 Gerasimus III of Constantinople, Ecumenical Patriarch in 1794–1797